is a Japanese football player for Avispa Fukuoka.

Career
After being born and raised in Fukuoka, Kanamori debuted with Avispa Fukuoka's first team in 2013. From there, he developed and became an asset for the club before moving to Kashima Antlers for 2017 season.

Club career statistics
Updated to 21 July 2022.

References

External links
Profile at Kashima Antlers

1994 births
Living people
Association football people from Fukuoka Prefecture
Japanese footballers
J1 League players
J2 League players
Avispa Fukuoka players
Kashima Antlers players
Sagan Tosu players
Footballers at the 2014 Asian Games
Association football forwards
Asian Games competitors for Japan